The Pioneros de Quintana Roo (Quintana Roo Pioneers in English) are a Mexican professional basketball team based in Cancún, México playing in Liga Nacional de Baloncesto Profesional (LNBP). During the 2010–2011 season the team made it to the finals. They became subchampions after losing to the Toros de Nuevo Laredo.

Honours
FIBA Americas League
Winner: 2012
Runner-up: 2015

Famous players
 Noe Alonzo
 Horacio Llamas
 Boubacar Aw
 Heberth Bayona
 Justin Anthony Keenan

External links
 Official website

Basketball teams established in 2006
Basketball teams in Mexico
Sports teams in Cancún
2006 establishments in Mexico